The Markaziy Stadium ( is a  multi-use football stadium in Qarshi, Uzbekistan. It serves as the home ground for Nasaf Qarshi.

Stadium specific
First match was played between Nasaf and Uz-Dong-Ju Andijon on August 8, 2008. The stadium is able to accommodate 21,000 spectators. The total capacity includes 180 VIP seats, 220 seats for the press and 6 for commentators.

Events
On October 29, 2011, Markaziy stadium was the Final venue of 2011 AFC Cup match between Nasaf and Kuwait SC.

References

Football venues in Uzbekistan